Bedle is a surname. Notable people with the surname include:

John Bedle (died 1667), English clergyman
Joseph D. Bedle (1831–1894), American politician
William Bedle (1679–1768), English cricketer

See also
 Beadle (disambiguation)